Dhummawad is a village in Dharwad district of Karnataka, India.

Demographics 
As of the 2011 Census of India there were 778 households in Dhummawad and a total population of 3,827 consisting of 1,949 males and 1,878 females. There were 535 children ages 0-6.

References

Villages in Dharwad district